Quercus insignis is a Mesoamerican species of oak in the white oak section, (Quercus section Quercus) within the beech family. It is native to southern Mexico and Central America, from Veracruz to Panamá.

Description 
Quercus insignis is generally a large tree, growing up to 30 meters in height. The acorns are large and distinctive, up to 8 cm in diameter, the cup covered with extended scales that give the cup a bur-like appearance. It produces acorns every five to ten years. Acorns mature in June to July in the southern parts of its Central American range, and in October in the northernmost populations in southern Mexico. 

It is generally a slow-growing tree, with a long life-cyle, and regenerates slowly after disturbances.

Range and habitat
Quercus insignis is found in humid mountain cloud forests, between 1500 and 2500 meters elevation. Despite a wide range, its populations are scattered and low-density.

In Mexico, its range includes the Sierra de San Juan in Nayarit, the Sierra el Cuale and Sierra de Manantlán in western Jalisco, scattered populations in the Sierra Madre del Sur of Guerrero and Oaxaca, the easternmost Trans-Mexican Volcanic Belt above Xalapa in Veracruz, and the Sierra Madre de Chiapas and Chiapas Highlands in Chiapas.

In Central America, its range includes the Maya Mountains of Belize, and scattered locations in the mountains of Honduras, Nicaragua, Costa Rica, and western Panama.

Conservation and threats
The species is rare in Mexico, Panama, and Guatemala, although reportedly still locally abundant in Nicaragua.

The species conservation status is Endangered. It suffers from habitat loss and habitat fragmentation from deforestation, often for timber extraction or conversion to coffee plantations.

References

External links
photo of herbarium specimen at Missouri Botanical Garden, collected in Veracruz in 1914, showing acorn of same individual as in other photo
collected in Veracruz in 1914, showing leaves of same individual as in other photo

insignis
Trees of Central America
Trees of Oaxaca
Trees of Veracruz
Trees of Jalisco
Trees of Nayarit
Trees of Guerrero
Flora of the Sierra Madre del Sur
Flora of the Trans-Mexican Volcanic Belt
Flora of the Chiapas Highlands
Sierra Madre de Chiapas
Plants described in 1843
Oaks of Mexico
Cloud forest flora of Mexico